Jackiopsis is a monotypic genus of flowering plants in the family Rubiaceae. The genus contains only one species, viz. Jackiopsis ornata, which is found in Borneo, Malaysia and Sumatra. It is also the only species in the tribe Jackieae.

According to Henry Nicholas Ridley, Malay name for Jackiopsis ornata is segan paya.

References

Jackieae
Monotypic Rubiaceae genera